Cardiac Arrest is the debut album by the funk band Cameo.

The album reached No. 16 on the R&B charts. It contains the hit singles "Rigor Mortis" and “Funk Funk”.

Critical reception
Rickey Vincent, in Funk: The Music, The People, and The Rhythm of The One, deemed the album an "exquisite [example] of the fertile, erotic realm of R&B-based funk at its most stretched out."

Track listing

Personnel
Larry Blackmon - lead vocals, drums, percussion
 Gregory Johnson - keyboards, piano, vocals
William Revis - bass guitar
Eric Durham - guitar
Arnett Leftenant - saxophone
Nathan Leftenant - trumpet
Tomi Jenkins, Kurt Jetter - vocals

Charts

Singles

References

External links
 Cardiac Arrest at Discogs

1977 debut albums
Cameo (band) albums